The following list of Washington (state) companies includes notable companies that are, or once were, headquartered in Washington.

Companies based in Washington

A
 Alaska Air Group
 Alaska Airlines
 Amazon
 ArenaNet
 Avast! Recording Company
 Avista

B
 Banfield Pet Hospital
 Banner Bank
 Bartell Drugs
 Big Fish Games
 Books4cars
 Burgerville
 Boeing

C
 Cartoys
 Costco
 Cyan Worlds

D
 Darigold
 Dick's Drive-In
 Dillanos Coffee Roasters

E
 Expedia Group
 Expeditors International
 ExtraHop Networks

F 
Fisher Investments
Focus Designs
Funko

G
 GarageGames
 Getty Images
 GiftTree

H
 Haggen
 Hi-School Pharmacy
 Horizon Air

I
 I Can Has Cheezburger?
Innersloth
 Itron 
 Ivar's

J
 John L. Scott
 Jones Soda

L
 Liberty Orchards
 LiquidPlanner
 LMN Architects
 Lollar Pickups

M
 Microsoft
 MOD Pizza
 MTR Western

N
 Nautilus, Inc.
 Nintendo Technology Development
 Nordstrom

P
 PACCAR
 Pacific Research Laboratories
 Papa Murphy's
 PCC Community Markets
 PeaceHealth
 Planetary Resources
 Premera Blue Cross

R
 Rainier Mountaineering
 Red Canoe Credit Union
 Redfin
 Recreational Equipment, Inc.
 Rosauers Supermarkets
 Russell Investments

S
 SAFE Boats International
 The Seattle Times Company
 Seattle's Best Coffee
 Simpson Investment Company
 Slalom Consulting
 Starbucks
 Stemilt Growers
 Symetra

T
 Tableau Software
 Talking Rain
 Taylor Shellfish Company
 Terra Bite Lounge
 T-Mobile US
 Tommy Bahama
 Trident Seafoods
 Tully's Coffee

U
 Uwajimaya

V
 Valve

W
 Walk Score
 Washington Trust Bank
 Weyerhaeuser
 WhitePages
 Windermere Real Estate

Y
 Yoke's Fresh Market

Z
 Zillow
 Zumiez
 ZymoGenetics

Companies formerly based in Washington

0-9
 43 Things

B
 Boeing
 Branded Entertainment Network

E
 EMC Isilon

G
 Group Health Cooperative

J
 JanSport

K
 Kaiser Aluminum
 Kaiser Permanente

Q
 Qliance

U
 UPS

R
 Red Robin

References

 
Washington (State)